Imadateiella shideiana is a species of proturan in the family Acerentomidae. It is found in Southern Asia.

Subspecies
These two subspecies belong to the species Imadateiella shideiana:
 Imadateiella shideiana eos (ImadatÃ©, 1974)
 Imadateiella shideiana shideiana (ImadatÃ©, 1964)

References

Further reading

 

Protura
Articles created by Qbugbot
Animals described in 1964